Foguang may refer to:

Foguang Temple, temple in Shanxi, China
Foguang University, university located in Yilan, Taiwan

See also
Fo Guang Shan